One way of outlining the subject of radio science is listing the topics associated with it by authoritative bodies.

Union of Radio Science International (URSI)
The International Union of Radio Science has several commissions corresponding to the following topics of interest:

 Commission A – Electromagnetic metrology
 Antennas
 Atomic-based mechatronics
 Bioeffects and medical applications
 Electromagnetic compatibility (EMC) and EM metrology
 High-frequency and millimeter wireless metrology
 Impulse radar
 Interconnect and packaging
 Materials
 Measurements and calibration in propagation
 Microwave to sub-millimeter measurements/standards
 Noise
 Quantum metrology and fundamental concepts
 Space plasma characterization
 Techniques for remote sensing
 Test facilities
 Tetrahertz (THz) metrology
 Time and frequency
 Time-domain metrology
 Commission B – Fields and waves
 Antenna arrays
 Antennas: recent advances and future outlook
 Antenna theory
 design and measurements
 Cognitive radio
 Complex media 
bandgap structures
 biological
 geophysical media
 metamaterials
 and others
 Educational methods and tools
 Electromagnetic interaction and coupling
 Guided waves and waveguiding structures
 High-frequency techniques
 Imaging
 inverse scattering and remote sensing
 Mathematical modeling of electromagnetic problems
 Microstrip antennas and printed devices
 Multiphysics electromagnetics
 Nanoscale electromagnetics
 Nonlinear electromagnetics 
 Numerical methods
differential-and integral-equation based
 hybrid and other techniques
 Optical phenomena
 Optimization techniques in electromagnetics
 Propagation phenomena and effects
 Rough surfaces and random media
 Scattering and diffraction
 Theoretical electromagnetics
 THz antennas and propagation
 Transient fields effects and systems
 Ultra-wideband electromagnetics 
 Wireless communications
 Commission C – Radiocommunication systems and signal processing
 Cognitive radio and software-defined radio
 Distributed sensor networks and sensors array processing
 Energy-efficient ("green") communications
 Information theory, coding, modulation and detection
 MIMO and MISO systems
 Novel radio communication systems
 Physics-based signal processing
 Radar target detection, localization, and tracking
 Radio localization and positioning
 Signal and image processing
 Spectrum and medium utilization
 Statistical signal processing of waves in random media
 Synthetic aperture and space-time processing
 Wireless networking
 Commission D – Electronics and photonics
 Broadband ubiquitous network
 Energy harvesting in wireless systems
 Fiber lasers and solid state lasers
 Graphene nanoelectronics applications
 Multi-physics modelling in radio frequency nanoelectronics
 Optical sensors and biosensors
 Plasmonics
 RF MEMS and NEMS
 Signal processing antennas
 60 GHz electronics
 Trends in RFID for identification and sensing
 Trends in THz communications
 Commission E – Electromagnetic environment and interference
 Communication in the presence of noise
 Crosstalk
 Electromagnetic compatibility education
 Electromagnetic compatibility measurements and standards
 Electromagnetic noise of natural origin
 Electromagnetic radiation hazards
 High-power effects of transients on electronic systems
 Spectrum management and utilization
 Commission F – Wave propagation and remote sensing
 Propagation measurements/models for fixed and mobile links
 Measurements of fixed and mobile channels
 Propagation models
 Multipath mitigation
 Fixed terrestrial links: measurements and design strategies
 Surface/atmosphere interaction
 Dispersion/delay
 Effects of natural/man-made structures
 Outdoor to indoor propagation
 Multi link MIMO channels
 UWB channel characteristics, Small cell propagation
 Remote sensing of the Earth/planets by radio waves
 Passive sensing at millimeter wavelengths
 Interferometry and SAR
 Sensing of snow in open and forested environments
 Remote sensing of precipitation
 Atmospheric sensing
 Sensing of soil moisture and biomass
 Ocean and ice sensing
 Urban environments
 Radio Frequency Interference (RFI)
 Underground imaging
 Propagation and remote sensing in complex and random media
 Commission G – Ionospheric radio and propagation
 Ionospheric imaging
 Ionospheric morphology
 Ionospheric modeling and data assimilation 
 Radar and radio techniques for ionospheric diagnostics
 Space weather – radio effects
 Transionospheric radio propagation and systems effects
 Commission H – Waves in plasma
 Chaos and turbulence in plasma
 Plasma instabilities and wave propagation
 Spacecraft-plasma interactions
 Solar/planetary plasma interactions
 Wave-wave and wave-particle interactions
 Waves in laboratory plasmas
 Commission J – Radio astronomy
 Detection of short-duration transients
 Developments in array technology for radio astronomy
 New telescopes, techniques, and observations
 Radio frequency interference mitigation and spectrum usage
 Square Kilometre Array
 Timely technical tutorials
 Commission K – Electromagnetics in biology and medicine
 Biological effects
 Dosimetry and exposure assessment
 Electromagnetic imaging and sensing applications
 Human body interactions with antennas and other electromagnetic devices
 Therapeutic, rehabilitative, and other biomedical applications

International Telecommunication Union (ITU-R)
The International Telecommunication Union (ITU) Radiocommunication Sector (ITU-R) has several study groups, each made of working parties, as follows:

 Study Group 1 – Spectrum management 
 1A: Spectrum engineering techniques 
 1B: Spectrum management methodologies and economic strategies 
 1C: Spectrum monitoring
 Study Group 3 – Radiowave propagation 
 3J: Propagation fundamentals 
 3K: Point-to-area propagation 
 3L: Ionospheric propagation and radio noise 
 3M: Point-to-point and Earth-space propagation
 Study Group 4 – Satellite services 
 4A: Efficient orbit/spectrum utilization for the fixed-satellite service (FSS) and broadcasting-satellite service (BSS) 
 4B: Systems, air interfaces, performance and availability objectives for the fixed-satellite service (FSS), broadcasting-satellite service (BSS) and mobile-satellite service (MSS), including IP-based applications and satellite news gathering (SNG) 
 4C: Efficient orbit/spectrum utilization for the mobile-satellite service (MSS) and the radiodetermination-satellite service (RDSS)
 Study Group 5 – Terrestrial services
 5A: Land mobile service above 30 MHz (excluding IMT); wireless access in the fixed service; amateur and amateur-satellite services 
 5B: Maritime mobile service including the Global Maritime Distress and Safety System (GMDSS); the aeronautical mobile service and the radiodetermination service 
 5C: Fixed wireless systems; HF and other systems below 30 MHz in the fixed and land mobile services 
 5D: IMT systems (International Mobile Telecommunications)
 Study Group 6 – Broadcasting service 
 6A: Terrestrial broadcasting delivery 
 6B: Broadcast service assembly and access 
 6C: Programme production and quality assessment 
 Study Group 7 – Science services 
 7A: Time signals and frequency standard emissions: Systems and applications (terrestrial and satellite) for dissemination of standard time and frequency signals
 7B: Space radiocommunication applications: Systems for transmission/reception of telecommunicated and tele-metry data
 7C: Remote sensing systems: for space operation and for space research
 7D: Radio astronomy: remote sensing systems and applications for Earth exploration meteorology and planetary sensing.

References

Radio science
Radio science